Major General Robert Elliot "Roy" Urquhart,  (28 November 1901 – 13 December 1988) was a British Army officer who saw service during the Second World War and Malayan Emergency. He became prominent for his role as General Officer Commanding the 1st Airborne Division, which fought with great distinction, although suffering very severe casualties, in the Battle of Arnhem during Operation Market Garden in September 1944.

Early life and military career
Roy Urquhart was born in Shepperton, Middlesex, England, on 28 November 1901, and was the son of a Scottish doctor. He was educated at St Paul's School, London, and the Royal Military College, Sandhurst. Urquhart was commissioned as a second lieutenant into the 1st Battalion, Highland Light Infantry on 24 December 1920. 

On 24 December 1922, he was promoted to lieutenant, and captain on 26 March 1929. Urquhart was assigned to the 2nd Battalion, when he was stationed in Malta from 1933 to 1936. He also served as an adjutant, and befriended David Niven during this time. Niven recalled Urquhart, in his autobiography The Moon's a Balloon, as "a serious soldier of great charm and warmth". 

Urquhart attended the Staff College, Camberley from 1936 to 1937, and then returned to the 2nd Battalion, commanded by Lieutenant Colonel Horatio Berney-Ficklin. At that time, it was based in Palestine and served during the Arab revolt. 

On 1 August 1938, Urquhart was promoted to major. He was then dispatched to India as a staff officer, and in May 1939 became the Deputy Assistant Quartermaster-General to Army HQ, India.

Second World War
When the Second World War broke out in September 1939, Urquhart was still serving in India. He remained there until 1941, when he was posted to North Africa. He was then sent back to the United Kingdom, as a staff officer in the 3rd Infantry Division. Thereafter, his career accelerated. Between 1941 and 1942 he was promoted to lieutenant-colonel, and commanded the 2nd Battalion, Duke of Cornwall's Light Infantry until 1942. Then he was appointed as a staff officer in the 51st (Highland) Infantry Division, which was then stationed in the United Kingdom before moving to North Africa in mid-1942. For a short time, after being promoted to brigadier, he commanded the 231st Infantry Brigade, which saw action during the Allied invasion of Sicily and in the early stages of the Italian Campaign. He then returned to England.

Arnhem

On return, he was assigned to XII Corps as a staff officer. In 1944, he was given command of the 1st Airborne Division. Urquhart was prone to airsickness, and had not commanded or been a member of an airborne formation. Although a newcomer, Urquhart commanded his division during Operation Market Garden in September 1944. The division was dropped into Arnhem, Netherlands, in an attempt to secure a crossing over the River Rhine. For nine days Urquhart's division fought unsupported against armoured units of II SS Panzer Corps and suffered increasingly heavy casualties during the Battle of Arnhem. On 25 September, the remnants of the division withdrew across the Rhine. During the battle, the 1st Airborne Division had lost over three-quarters of its strength. Shattered as a fighting formation, the division was withdrawn to the United Kingdom and saw no further action in the war. Urquhart was awarded the Dutch Bronze Lion.

Norway

In May 1945, following the German surrender, Urquhart led the 1st Airborne Division, as the advanced guard of Force 134, during Operation Doomsday, the Allied reoccupation of Norway. He was charged with supervising the surrender of the German forces, as well as preventing the sabotage of vital military and civilian facilities. Due to delays in troop arrivals, Urquhart ended up driving into Oslo in a captured German staff car, accompanied only by four military policemen and two infantry platoons. Until the arrival of the Headquarters of Allied Forces, Norway, Urquhart had complete control over all Norwegian activities. As a result, Urquhart welcomed Crown Prince Olaf of Norway, and three ministers representing the Norwegian Government, when they arrived on a Royal Navy cruiser. General Sir Andrew Thorne arrived on 13 May, and assumed command of Allied forces. At the end of August, the 1st Airborne Division and Urquhart returned to the United Kingdom where his division was disbanded in November. Urquhart was awarded the Norwegian Order of St. Olav, for his role in the liberation of the country.

Post-war service
Following the end of the war, Urquhart became Director of the Territorial Army and Army Cadet Force at the War Office. He was then made General Officer Commanding, of the newly raised Territorial Army 16th Airborne Division in 1947. This was followed by holding command of the 51st/52nd Scottish Division until 1950. After which, he was appointed as the General Officer Commanding Malaya Command during the Malayan Emergency and GOC-in-C British Troops in Austria. He retired from the army in 1955.

Later life
After leaving the army, Urquhart became an executive in the heavy engineering industry, and retired in 1970. Urquhart was portrayed by Sean Connery in the 1977 film A Bridge Too Far, for which he himself served as a military consultant.

Urquhart and his wife Pamela had four children, among them Elspeth Campbell (wife of the former leader of the Liberal Democrat party Menzies Campbell) and Suki Urquhart, author of The Scottish Gardener, third wife of Keith Schellenberg. In his memoirs, Campbell wrote that Urquhart told Elspeth's first husband, Philip Grant-Suttie, "there's no need to be formal; just call me General", and that he also insisted on tasting all the food and champagne for Elspeth and Menzies' wedding before paying for it.

Urquhart died on 13 December 1988, aged 87.

Works

References

Bibliography

Further reading

Private Papers of Major General R E Urquhart CB DSO can be found in the Imperial War Museum, Documents and Sound section, ref: Documents.15783 (07/64/1-12).

External links
1st British Airborne Division officers
Generals of World War II
Imperial War Museum Interview

|-

|-

|-
 

|-
 

|-

1901 births
1988 deaths
British Army generals of World War II
British Army personnel of the Malayan Emergency
British military personnel of the 1936–1939 Arab revolt in Palestine
Companions of the Distinguished Service Order
Companions of the Order of the Bath
Graduates of the Royal Military College, Sandhurst
Graduates of the Staff College, Camberley
Highland Light Infantry officers
People educated at St Paul's School, London
People from Shepperton
Recipients of the Bronze Lion
Duke of Cornwall's Light Infantry officers
Military personnel from Middlesex
British Army major generals